literally means first street in Japanese. It can refer to:

Emperor Ichijō (一条天皇 -tennō), the 66th Emperor of Japan (980–1011)

Japanese surname
 The Ichijō family (一条家 -ke), one of the five regent houses (go-sekke) of the Fujiwara clan in Japan
 Kazuya Ichijō, a Japanese voice actor

Fictional characters
 Kaoru Ichijou of Kamen Rider Kuuga
 Mashiro Ichijō of After School Nightmare.
 Hikaru Ichijō of the Super Dimension Fortress Macross.
 Ichijō of Pani Poni
 Eika Ichijō of Sky Girls
 Sumireko Ichijō and Kaoruko Ichijō of Futakoi
 Takuma Ichijō of Vampire Knight
 Kou Ichijō of Persona 4
 Haruhiko Ichijō of Myriad Colors Phantom World
 Hotaru Ichijō of Non Non Biyori
 Supreme Commander Ichijō of Choujin Sentai Jetman
 Ryōma Ichijō of Love Stage!!
 Raku Ichijō of  Nisekoi
 Ichijō Ayane of  Full Metal Daemon: Muramasa (“Ichijō” being used as a given name)

Places
 , one of numbered east-west streets in the ancient capital of Heian-kyō, present-day Kyoto

Japanese-language surnames